The Palacio de Gobierno de Jalisco, or simply Palacio de Gobierno (English: Government Palace), is an historic government building in Centro, Guadalajara, in the Mexican state of Jalisco.

References

External links

 

Buildings and structures in Guadalajara, Jalisco
Centro, Guadalajara
Government buildings in Mexico